Ready Player One is a 2018 American science fiction film based on Ernest Cline's novel of the same name. Directed by Steven Spielberg from a screenplay by Zak Penn and Cline, it stars Tye Sheridan, Olivia Cooke, Ben Mendelsohn, Lena Waithe, T.J. Miller, Simon Pegg, and Mark Rylance. The film is set in 2045, where much of humanity uses the OASIS, a virtual reality simulation, to escape the real world. A teenage orphan finds clues to a contest that promises the ownership of the OASIS to the winner, and he and his allies try to complete it before an evil corporation can do so.

Development of the film first began in 2010 when Warner Bros. acquired the rights to the book. In July 2015, Spielberg signed on to direct and produce the film, with casting commencing in September 2015. Filming began in England in June 2016 and was completed in September that year. The visual effects were handled by Industrial Light & Magic, Digital Domain, and Territory Studio, with some pre-visualization work done by The Third Floor. As with the novel, many popular culture references appear throughout the film, including references to The Shining, the Back to the Future franchise, and The Iron Giant.

Ready Player One premiered at South by Southwest in Austin, Texas on March 11, 2018, and was theatrically released by Warner Bros. Pictures in the United States on March 29, 2018. The film received positive reviews from critics, who praised Spielberg's direction, the visual effects, brisk pacing, and the performances of both Sheridan and Rylance. It grossed around $583 million worldwide, and earned a nomination for Best Visual Effects at the 91st Academy Awards, 24th Critics' Choice Awards, and 72nd British Academy Film Awards. Ready Player One was awarded the title of Best Science Fiction Film at the 45th Saturn Awards, and a further two Outstanding Achievement Awards from the Visual Effects Society. A sequel is in development.

Plot 

In a dystopian 2045, people seek to escape from reality through the virtual reality entertainment universe called the OASIS (Ontologically Anthropocentric Sensory Immersive Simulation), created by James Halliday and Ogden Morrow of Gregarious Games. After Halliday's death, a pre-recorded message left by his avatar Anorak announces a game, granting ownership of the OASIS to the first to find the golden Easter egg within it, which gets locked behind a gate requiring three keys which players can obtain by accomplishing three challenges. The contest has lured several "Gunters", or egg hunters, and the interest of Nolan Sorrento, the CEO of Innovative Online Industries (IOI) who seeks to control the OASIS himself by inserting intrusive online advertising. IOI uses an army of indentured servants, and employees called "Sixers" to find the egg.

Teenage orphan Wade Watts' avatar Parzival, an avid Gunter, participates in the first challenge, an unbeatable race, along with his best friend Aech, and Art3mis, a female avatar on whom Parzival has a crush. Parzival regularly visits Halliday's Journals, a simulated archive of Halliday's life and hobbies, run by the Curator. Wade receives the Copper Key from Anorak after he wins by driving backward, while Art3mis, Aech, and his friends Daito and Sho, all win the race afterward, later being collectively named the High-5 on the OASIS' scoreboard.

Sorrento asks mercenary i-R0k to learn Wade's true identity, intending to bribe him to win the contest on IOI's behalf. Wade and Art3mis discover from the Journals that Halliday once dated Morrow's wife Karen "Kira" Underwood. Wade and Art3mis visit the Distracted Globe night club to look for clues, where Wade confesses his love and true name to Art3mis. They survive an IOI raid in which Art3mis abandons Wade, explaining that her father died in debt to IOI. i-R0k, who was eavesdropping on their conversation, informs Sorrento of his findings. Sorrento contacts Wade with his offer. When rejected, Sorrento attempts to dispose of Wade by bombing his home, killing his aunt Alice and her boyfriend Rick among others. Art3mis' player Samantha Cook takes Wade in. Together, they realize the second challenge relates to Halliday's regret of not pursuing a relationship with Kira. Along with Aech, Daito, and Sho, Parzival and Art3mis search for the recreation of the Overlook Hotel. Art3mis asks Kira to dance and wins the Jade Key. Sorrento's subordinate F'Nale Zandor storms the Gunters' hideout, taking Samantha to an IOI Loyalty Center to pay off her father's debt. Wade escapes with the help of the other High-5 users, Helen Harris (Aech), Toshiro (Daito), and Zhou (Sho) in Helen's truck. Samantha escapes confinement after Aech and Parzival hack Sorrento's OASIS rig.

The third challenge is found in Castle Anorak on Planet Doom, where players must guess Halliday's favorite Atari 2600 game to earn the Crystal Key. i-R0k places a forcefield around the castle using the Orb of Osuvox, but Art3mis soon disables it. The High-5 lead an army of OASIS players against IOI's forces. Parzival kills Samantha's avatar, allowing her to flee IOI with the High-5 picking her up nearby.  Parzival and Sorrento fight in the OASIS with Sorrento detonating the Cataclyst bomb, wiping out every avatar on Planet Doom including himself. Parzival survives using an extra life coin given to him earlier by the Curator in a bet. He plays Adventure, winning the Crystal Key by locating Warren Robinett's Easter egg. He uses the three keys to enter a treasure room, where Anorak offers him a contract to sign. Parzival recognizes it as the one Morrow signed when Halliday forced him out of Gregarious Games and refuses to sign it. Anorak transforms into Halliday, who expresses his regrets in life and awards Parzival the Easter egg.

Ogden Morrow appears, revealing that he is the Curator. Wade decides to run the OASIS with the High-5, inviting Morrow to join them as a consultant. After Aech sends the police a copy of Sorento confessing to the bombing, he and F'Nale are arrested. As the IOI Loyalty Centers are shut down, the High-5 make the controversial choice to close the OASIS every Tuesday and Thursday for people to spend more time in the real world, including Wade and Samantha, who start a relationship.

Cast 

 Tye Sheridan as Wade Watts / Parzival
 Olivia Cooke as Samantha Cooke / Art3mis
 Ben Mendelsohn as Nolan Sorrento / IOI-655321
 Lena Waithe as Helen Harris / Aech
 T.J. Miller as i-R0k
 Simon Pegg as Ogden Morrow / The Curator
 Mark Rylance as James Halliday / Anorak the All-Knowing
 Philip Zhao as Zhou / Sho
 Win Morisaki as Toshiro / Daito
 Hannah John-Kamen as F'Nale Zandor
 Susan Lynch as Alice
 Ralph Ineson as Rick
 Perdita Weeks as Karen "Kira" Underwood

Letitia Wright, Mckenna Grace, and Lulu Wilson make appearances in the film, with Wright as a rebel who can be seen at Samantha's safe house, and Grace and Wilson as students using the OASIS.

Production

Development and casting 

Warner Bros. bought the film rights for producers Dan Farah and Donald De Line in June 2010, one year before the book was published. Ernest Cline was set to write the script for the film, which De Line and Farah would produce. Eric Eason rewrote Cline's script, and Zak Penn was hired to rewrite the previous drafts by Cline and Eason (who became uncredited for the final draft), along with Village Roadshow Pictures coming aboard. Steven Spielberg signed on to direct and produce the film, which Kristie Macosko Krieger also produced, along with De Line and Farah. Cline and Penn made several revisions while adapting the novel to film. Most of these changes were to eliminate scenes that would be uninteresting in a visual format, such as when Wade beats a high score in Pac-Man, or recites all the lines from the film WarGames. In 2016, American musician Moby said he had tried to make the book into a movie, but discovered that Spielberg had taken the role before him.

Elle Fanning, Olivia Cooke, and Lola Kirke were the frontrunners for the role of Art3mis; with Cooke announced as having been cast in the role by September 2015. In January 2016, Ben Mendelsohn joined the cast. In February 2016, Tye Sheridan was confirmed to play Wade, after a lengthy casting search for the role. Simon Pegg was added to the cast in March, with Mark Rylance joining in April. By June, T.J. Miller, Hannah John-Kamen, and Win Morisaki had also been cast in the film. In July, Philip Zhao joined the cast, with Lena Waithe, Ralph Ineson, Mckenna Grace, and Letitia Wright being revealed as appearing in the film over time prior to the film's release.

In October 2019, Doctor Sleep director Mike Flanagan revealed that Jack Nicholson, who portrayed Jack Torrance in The Shining, was approached to appear in the film, but declined the offer due to his retirement.

Filming 
Production was slated to begin in July 2016, but on July 1, 2016, screenwriter Zak Penn confirmed that the first week of filming had already been completed, meaning that filming began on June 24, 2016. In August and September 2016, filming took place in Birmingham, England, standing in for Columbus, Ohio. Birmingham filming included on Livery Street in the Jewellery Quarter area of the city, which was used for multiple scenes in the film. Ludgate Hill Car Park lot on Lionel Street, in which caravan homes were partially built, was also used, and a planned explosion there caused some local businesses and residents to call emergency services as no prior notice was given by the production team. Other locations in the city included the former industrial area of Digbeth, and some of the city's landmarks were erased and replaced with CGI buildings to create a dystopian future Ohio. Outside of Birmingham, filming also took place at Warner Bros. Studios, Leavesden and at Solaris House, the former Sun Microsystems headquarters in Surrey. Principal photography wrapped on September 27, 2016.

Visual effects 
Industrial Light & Magic (ILM), Digital Domain, and Territory Studio developed the visual effects, with some pre-visualization work done by The Third Floor. For three hours three days a week, Spielberg met with ILM, which was in charge of the OASIS segments and produced the bulk of the visual effects shots, with 900 in total; Spielberg remarked that "this is the most difficult movie I've done since Saving Private Ryan", as three 3-hour long meetings a week were necessitated to discuss the visual effects. Visual effects supervisor Roger Guyett stated that the VFX team would collaborate with Spielberg and writers Cline and Penn: 

Part of the film takes place in a virtual space based on the Overlook Hotel in the film The Shining. This was mostly a digital recreation using high-quality telecine of the original film, allowing new camera angles and shots that did not appear in the original. Some original footage from The Shining was also used, with ILM's modifications. Only a few scenes in this sequence involved real actors (such as the appearance of the Grady twins) and required reproduction of The Shinings physical sets. The Shining sequence was post-processed with film grain and other aging effects to make the new footage closely resemble the original. During the production of Ready Player One, The VFX team built the sequence the Overlook Hotel in the digital realm. Stanley Kubrick's blueprints were used to recreate the hotel in the film. ILM also had to produce digital versions of the film's many cultural references, including the DeLorean time machine (from the Back to the Future films); the Iron Giant; Chucky; and King Kong, modeled after the 1933 film version. The Tyrannosaurus rex from Jurassic Park was created from the base model ILM had created. Digital Domain facilitated pre-visualization (with The Third Floor), motion capture, and virtual sets, and also created 300 visual effects shots for the primarily live-action portions of the film. The virtual sets were powered by game engines and were used congruently with the motion-capture process, with previsualization supervisor Scott Meadows explaining that in real time Spielberg would "put on a headset and scout the sets and make adjustments."

Music 

On June 9, 2016, John Williams was initially going to compose the film's score. However, in July 2017, Williams left the project in favor of scoring Spielberg's The Post, and Alan Silvestri took over scoring duties for the film. The official score was released by WaterTower Music as a two-CD set on March 30, 2018, with vinyl and cassette releases projected. At Spielberg's request, Silvestri references his own music from Back to the Future within the film's score, as well as quoting music written by other composers including Max Steiner's theme from King Kong, Akira Ifukube’s main theme from Godzilla, and the score by Wendy Carlos and Rachel Elkind from The Shining.

Cultural references 

Ready Player One pays homage to popular culture from various time periods, mainly the 1970s and 1980s but also extending to the 1990s, 2000s, and 2010s; reviewers have identified over a hundred references to films, television shows, music, toys, video games, anime, and comics from these eras. Cline did not have any issues with these copyrighted elements when he published the book, but was aware that securing all necessary rights would be a major obstacle for a film adaptation. This task was eventually made easier thanks to Spielberg's reputation in the film industry. In the end, Spielberg estimated that they managed to get about 80% of the copyrighted elements they desired. The production was not able to secure the rights to Spielberg's own Close Encounters of the Third Kind from Columbia Pictures.

The Dungeons & Dragons module Tomb of Horrors features in an important episode of the book, the "Copper Key challenge", but that reference was excluded from the film, where the challenge features a huge car race in New York instead. However, the movie does reference the module: artwork of the Tomb of Horrors demon appears on the back of Aech's van.

Similarly Blade Runner, which was integral to the plot of the book, was shelved as Blade Runner 2049 was in production at the same time as Ready Player One and the producers at Alcon Entertainment feared that Spielberg's film could damage the commercial prospects of their film; as a replacement, the creative team had the players play through the events of The Shining, which Spielberg was able to secure the rights to as an homage to his friend Stanley Kubrick. Penn and Cline also thought that the film could be the opportunity to replace such a lengthy sequence with a more action-heavy one. Once they decided to use The Shining, they were doubtful at first that Spielberg would accept the change, but Spielberg did go for it. While Cline's original work heavily used the character of Ultraman, the rights over the character were still under legal dispute, requiring them to replace Ultraman with the titular robot from The Iron Giant and RX-78-2 Gundam. Spielberg recognized that his past films were a significant part of the 1980s popular culture cited in the book, and to avoid being accused of "vanity", he opted to remove many of the references to his own work. Cline stated that he believed Spielberg wanted to avoid self-references to films he directed, due to the criticism he received for his film 1941, which lampooned his own previous works Jaws and Duel. Cline said he had to convince Spielberg to include some iconic elements, such as the DeLorean time machine from Back to the Future, which Spielberg conceded as the film was one he produced rather than directed. Spielberg also allowed the Tyrannosaurus rex from his own Jurassic Park to be included. Cline also asked ILM to include a reference to Last Action Hero, one of Penn's first screenplays, without Penn's knowledge; a movie marquee in the Manhattan race segment bears the name "Jack Slater", the character Arnold Schwarzenegger played in that film.

Release

Theatrical 
Ready Player One was originally scheduled to be released on December 15, 2017. However, on February 9, 2016, the film was delayed to March 30, 2018, to avoid competition with Star Wars: The Last Jedi. In January 2018, it was announced the film's release date had been moved up one day to March 29, 2018. The film had its world premiere at the Paramount Theatre in Austin, Texas on March 11, 2018 (as part of the South by Southwest Film Festival). Warner Bros. distributed the film worldwide, with Village Roadshow Pictures distributing in several overseas territories. Around the same time the film was released, massively multi-player online game platform Roblox held an event based on it. The winner of the event was the user r0cu.

Home media 
Ready Player One was released on digital copy on July 3, 2018, and on 4K UHD Blu-ray, Blu-ray 3D, Blu-ray, and DVD on July 24, 2018. The film debuted at the top of the NPD VideoScan First Alert chart, a tracker of combined domestic Blu-Ray and DVD unit sales, for the week ending on July 27, 2018. It retained the No. 1 spot on the chart for the week ending on August 4, 2018.

Reception

Box office 
Ready Player One grossed $137.7 million in the United States and Canada, and $454.5 million in other territories, for a worldwide total of $592 million. Deadline Hollywood estimated that the film needed to gross at least $440 million in order to break even.

In the United States and Canada, Ready Player One was projected to gross $40–50 million from 4,100 theaters over its first four days. It made $12.1 million on its first day, including $3.75 million from Wednesday night previews. It ended up grossing $41.8 million in its opening weekend (for a four-day total of $53.7 million). The film made $24.6 million in its second weekend, finishing second behind newcomer A Quiet Place, and $11.5 million in its third weekend, finishing in fourth.

Critical response 
The site's critical consensus reads, "Ready Player One is a sweetly nostalgic thrill ride that neatly encapsulates Spielberg's strengths while adding another solidly engrossing adventure to his filmography." On Metacritic, the film has a weighted average score of 64 out of 100 based on 56 critics, indicating "generally favorable reviews". Audiences polled by CinemaScore gave the film an average grade of "A−" on an A+ to F scale, and those at PostTrak gave the film an 82% overall positive score and a 65% "definite recommend".

In a review for RogerEbert.com, Brian Tallerico wrote that the film's "overwhelming" nature and non-stop action will likely thrill fans of pop culture; while he observed narrative weaknesses, such as a lack of depth among the supporting characters, he felt that they ultimately do not hinder the film from working "on the level of technical, blockbuster mastery that Spielberg helped define". Writing for Variety, Owen Gleiberman called the film a "coruscating explosion of pop-culture eye candy" and found the sequence based on The Shining to be "irresistible". However, he criticized Spielberg's separation of fantasy and reality, and he said the film has "more activity than it does layers". IndieWires Eric Kohn characterized the film as "an astonishing sci-fi spectacle and a relentless nostalgia trip at once" and praised both the sequence based on The Shining and Penn's screenplay, particularly with respect to Mendelsohn's character. Nevertheless, he remarked that the film "drags a bunch in its final third". Alissa Wilkinson, writing for Vox, praised both the quality and quantity of the worldbuilding. She also commented on just how dystopian the future portrayed is, where the main characters fight to save the OASIS and the escape from reality it represents, with arguably less concern for the problems of the real world. Film and television critic Matt Zoller Seitz praised Ready Player One and noted the undercurrent of sadness present in the film, stating that "I don't think Spielberg gets enough credit for making sad films that most people interpret as happy, and complex films that are immediately dismissed as simple or confused". Seitz concluded that the film "is a mess, but it is a fascinating and complex one..." In March 2019, a year after the film's release, Seitz determined that with Ready Player Ones images commenting on capitalism and popular culture, the film was the second-most "interesting [and] substantive" big-budgeted fantasy in 2018 after Black Panther, admitting that "I still think about [Ready Player One] a lot, especially concerning the world around me."

Monica Castillo was more critical of the film in her review for The Guardian and drew attention to the absence of character arcs, the lack of resolution for plot holes in the novel, and the bloating of scenes in the film by trivia. Alonso Duralde, writing for TheWrap, found the usage of pop culture references lacking, and found his experience watching the film as "feeling bombarded with images, bored by the lack of an interesting story, and irritated with my own cultural past. I've never been much of a video-game player, but by the finale, I was ready to 'Leeroy Jenkins!' my way out of the theater".

Accolades

Sequel 
When asked about a sequel to the film, Cline stated: "I think there's a good chance that, if this one does well, Warner Bros. will want to make a sequel. I don't know if Steven [Spielberg] would want to dive back in, because he would know what he is getting into. He's said that it's the third-hardest film he's made, out of dozens and dozens of movies". Co-star Olivia Cooke, and presumably the rest of the cast, is "contracted to sequels". Cline wrote a book sequel, titled Ready Player Two, which was released on November 24, 2020, stating in the acknowledgments that he had consulted Spielberg on the final draft of the book and where to take an adaptation. On December 22, 2020, Cline announced that a sequel was in the early stages of development.

References

External links 

 
 
 

2010s American films
2010s English-language films
2010s science fiction adventure films
2018 3D films
2018 films
2018 science fiction action films
4DX films
Amblin Entertainment films
American 3D films
American adventure films
American crossover films
American dystopian films
American fantasy films
American films with live action and animation
American science fiction action films
American science fiction adventure films
American teen films
Cyberpunk films
Drone films
Dune Entertainment films
Easter egg (media)
Films about orphans
Films about telepresence
Films about video games
Films about virtual reality
Films based on American novels
Films based on science fiction novels
Films directed by Steven Spielberg
Films scored by Alan Silvestri
Films produced by Donald De Line
Films produced by Steven Spielberg
Films set in 2045
Films set in Columbus, Ohio
Films set in the future
Films shot in Hertfordshire
Films shot in London
Films shot at Warner Bros. Studios, Leavesden
Films with screenplays by Ernest Cline
Films with screenplays by Zak Penn
Films using motion capture
IMAX films
Marvin the Martian films
Metafictional works
Nostalgia in the United States
Teen action films
Teen adventure films
Teen science fiction films
Village Roadshow Pictures films
Warner Bros. films